Ben Harris (born 8 September 1999 in England) is an English rugby union player who plays for  in Premiership Rugby. His playing position is wing. He was promoted to Saracens' first-team squad ahead of the 2021–22 season. Harris has represented England at rugby sevens since 2017, playing in 14 tournaments. He was named the “England 7’s RPA Mens Player of the Year” for the 2019/20 season, making him the youngest player to receive the award. He also competed in the men's tournament at the 2020 Summer Olympics for Great Britain.

Reference list

External links
itsrugby.co.uk profile

1999 births
English rugby union players
Living people
Rugby union wings
Saracens F.C. players
Male rugby sevens players
English rugby sevens players
Olympic rugby sevens players of Great Britain
Rugby sevens players at the 2020 Summer Olympics